The long lipinia (Lipinia longiceps) is a species of skink found in Papua New Guinea.

References

Lipinia
Reptiles described in 1895
Taxa named by George Albert Boulenger